Sofka Nikolić (1907 – 27 July 1982) was a Bosnian and Yugoslav singer of folk music considered to be the first major music star in Yugoslavia. She recorded over 55 LP records.

Biography
She started to sing as a minor at local fairs and events and she later went on to sing in kafanas of Sarajevo and Mostar, where she was best-known for performance of Bosnian love songs sevdalinkas. The first LP by Nikolić was recorded in 1927 and it contained several hits like Kolika je Jahorina planina and Kad bi znala, dilber Stano. 

Her major concerts were in the 1920s, after which she moved to Belgrade and married fellow musician Paja Nikolić. His orchestra was a regular on Nikolić's concert tours, including a number of concerts abroad in Sofia, Berlin, Prague, Moscow, Vienna, Budapest, Madrid, London, Rome and Paris. Sofka Nikolić's musical adaptations of folk poems and original compositions attracted a large number fans. Her songs was praised by Josephine Baker, Aleksa Šantić, Branislav Nušić and other famous artists.

Nikolić had one daughter who died in an accident in 1936, after which Nikolić retired from public life.

A street in Bijeljina is named after her.

Selected singles 
Ali paša na Hercegovini
 Cojle, Manojle
 Kolika je Jahorina planina
 Kad bi znala, dilber Stano
 Moj dilbere 
 Čuješ seko
 Igrali se vrani konji
 Ja nabacih udicu
 Lijepa li je u Alage ljuba
 Zapevala bulbul ptica
 Zone, mori Zone
 Zulfe, mori Zulfe 
 Od kako je Banja Luka postala
 Oj Boga ti, siva ptico sokole
 Sagradiću šajku
 Svu noć mlada
 Uzmi sine Stanu
 Tri put ti čuknam
 Po mesečini, kraj šimšira

References 

1907 births
1982 deaths
Musicians from Šabac
Yugoslav women singers
Serbian folk singers